The Empress of India Medal, also referred to as KIH Medal, was a commemorative medal awarded to mark the occasion of the proclamation of Queen Victoria as Empress of India in 1877. It was the first wearable medal issued to mark a commemorative occasion within the British Empire. The medal was awarded in gold to Indian princes and senior officials and in silver to selected British and Indian military officers and civilians, as well as one soldier from each British and Indian regiment serving in India at the time of the proclamation celebrations of the 1877 Delhi Durbar.

History
The first official medals to commemorate the coronation of a British sovereign were distributed in 1547, marking the coronation of King Edward VI.  These medals were medallions or commemorative coins, not intended for wear.  The first official medal, commemorating a royal occasion, which could be worn, was the Empress of India Medal.  This medal marked the occasion of the proclamation at the Delhi Durbar of Queen Victoria as Empress of India on 1 January 1877.

Appearance
The medal was made in both gold and silver.  It measures  in diameter, nearly 20 mm more than a campaign medal.The obverse of the medal depicts the diademed effigy of Queen Victoria, wearing a veil which falls over the back of the head and neck. Around the beaded edge of the medal is inscribed Victoria 1st January 1877.The reverse bears the inscription Empress of India in English, Hind-ka-Kesar in Hindustani, and Qaisar-e-Hind in Persian. Around the edge is a repeating decorative design.It was issued unnamed, although some medals were later engraved privately.

It was worn on a  ribbon around the neck.  The ribbon is crimson, with thin yellow stripes at the edges.

Award criteria
The medal was awarded in gold to Indian princes and senior officials, and in silver to selected British and Indian officers and civilians, as well as a selected soldier from each British and Indian regiment serving in India at the time.  The medal was not permitted to be worn by officers and soldiers of the British and Indian armies in uniform, although it was frequently worn by Indian princes and civilians.

Award ceremony
During the Durbar proclaiming Victoria Empress of India, the Viceroy, arrayed in the robes of the Grand Master of the Order of the Star of India, received each of the 63 ruling princes of India in turn, he:

Recipients 

 Jung Bahadur Rana
 Vijaya Mohana Muktamba Bai
 Sultan Jahan, Begum of Bhopal
 Seth Baldeo Dass Sarda of Punjab
 Bhagvatsinhji
 Sayajirao Gaekwad III
 Raghubir Singh Jind
 Kasturchand Daga
 Kalb Ali Khan
 Mahboob Ali Khan
 Muhammad Mushtaq Ali Khan
 Khengarji III
 Ranodip Singh Kunwar
 Hira Singh Nabha
 Nripendra Narayan
 Ramachandra Tondaiman
 Chandra Shumsher Jang Bahadur Rana
 Jayajirao Scindia
 Shivaji VI
 Pratap Singh of Jammu and Kashmir
 Jaswant Singh of Bharatpur
 Lakshmeshwar Singh
 Rameshwar Singh
 Ranbir Singh of Jammu and Kashmir
 Shah Jahan Begum
 Visakham Thirunal
 Ayilyam Thirunal

References

External links
= Empress of India Medal 1877 Information. OMSA Medal Database
= Empress of India Medal, 1877, gold. OMSA Medal Database
= Empress of India Medal, 1877, silver. OMSA Medal Database

Orders, decorations, and medals of British India
Awards established in 1877
Awards disestablished in 1877
1877 establishments in British India
Queen Victoria